Mark S. Boguski (died March 18, 2021) was an American pathologist specializing in computational analysis and structural biology, He was elected in 2001 to  the U.S. National Academy of Medicine, and was a Fellow of the American College of Medical Informatics (elected 2001).

Education
Boguski earned his M.D. and Ph.D. in molecular biology in December 1986 from the Washington University School of Medicine and the Division of Biology and Biomedical Sciences, Medical Scientist Training Program, St. Louis, Missouri. He was Jeff Gordon's first graduate student. In 1989, Boguski became a Medical Staff Fellow under Dr. David J. Lipman at the National Institute of Diabetes and Digestive and Kidney Diseases at the U.S. National Institutes of Health and joined the nascent National Center for Biotechnology Information as an Investigator in 1990. He was tenured as a Senior Investigator in 1995.

Career 
Boguski served on the faculties of the U.S. National Institutes of Health, the Johns Hopkins University School of Medicine, and Harvard Medical School, and as an executive in the biotechnology and pharmaceutical industries. He was a former Vice President and Global Head of Genome and Protein Sciences at Novartis. Subsequently, he became Chief Medical Officer of Liberty BioSecurity, LLC and founded the Precision Medicine Network in 2014. He has written a series of books on cancer for the general public under the series title Reimagining Cancer. Boguski was a past Editor-in-Chief of the journal Genomics.

Research

Bioinformatics and computational biology
Boguski's work in computational biology has, over the years, involved algorithm development (e.g.: Gibbs sampler, text mining), database design, development and implementation (dbEST, XREFdb, ArrayDB) and data mining, data analysis and data annotation. One database effort in particular, the database of Expressed Sequence Tags (dbEST, 1993), has enjoyed a particularly influential life contributing first to gene discovery and subsequently to succeeding generations of genomics applications, namely transcript mapping, design and construction of microarrays, discovery in silico of single nucleotide polymorphisms and, ultimately, analysis and annotation of the human genome.

Genome and proteome research
Comparative Genomics & Evolution - Boguski's group first coined the term comparative genomics in 1995 to describe their work on the large-scale sequence analysis of the homologs of human disease genes in model organisms and the first comparative genomics database, XREFdb. Over the next six years they studied thousands of gene sets in humans, rats, mice, Drosophila, nematodes, and yeast and established the basic evolutionary parameters for interpretation of conserved protein-encoding genes in the human genome.
Transcript Mapping - Clusters of human genes and ESTs (“UniGenes”) were utilized to construct the first comprehensive transcript map of the human genome (1996, 1998).  Historically, this was the first instance of Science magazine using the World Wide Web to publish results, provide hyper-linked information resources and supplemental data sets. These maps facilitated and accelerated the positional cloning of hundreds of genes and this mapping approach was widely applied to other organisms.
Functional Genomics - Boguski's group used human UniGenes to design and construct the first human cDNA microarray (representing 10,000 genes) and were first to provide a rigorous definition of functional genomics for the community. While on sabbatical at NHGRI, their group implemented the first relational database and analysis system, ArrayDB, for microarray data. This design was copied by numerous academic and commercial groups. Their group was also first to apply methods of statistical text-mining to the interpretation of gene expression profiles. In the 2001 Genome Issue of Nature, they immediately followed the first publication of the human genome sequence with a paper showing how to use microarray technology to experimentally annotate and correct computational gene predictions.
Pharmacogenomics - They cloned and sequenced the pregnane X receptor that encodes the key transcription factor regulating the expression of genes encoding drug and xenobiotic metabolizing enzymes. They also identified functional sequence polymorphisms in the promoters of these genes, cytochromes P450 3A (CYP3A), and studied the genotypes and corresponding molecular phenotypes in several populations differing in their drug-metabolizing abilities.
Neurogenomics - They pioneered the application of genome-scale approaches to neurobiology with the construction of a comprehensive, 3-dimensional transcript map of the mouse brain, the Allen Brain Atlas.
Proteomics and Knowledge Mining - At Novartis, Boguski's division was responsible for the application of proteomics technologies and computational knowledge-mining Systems Biology for drug target and biomarker discovery.

References

External links
Mark Boguski’s website

Year of birth missing
Suicides in the United States
Washington University School of Medicine alumni
Johns Hopkins University faculty
Harvard Medical School faculty
Johns Hopkins University alumni
Members of the National Academy of Medicine
 2021 deaths
 2021 suicides